Such a Rascal (German: So ein Flegel) is a 1934 German comedy film and starring Heinz Rühmann, Ellen Frank and Annemarie Sörensen. It was shot at the EFA Studios in Berlin. The film's sets were designed by the art directors Karl Böhm and Erich Czerwonski. Based on the novel Die Feuerzangenbowle by Heinrich Spoerl,  Rühmann starred in the double role of the brothers Pfeiffer in this lesser known movie a decade before playing Hans Pfeiffer in the more popular 1944 version.

Synopsis
It modifies the story of the novel by introducing the concept of two brothers Pfeiffer switching places: While the younger brother takes over his elder brother's job, the older brother attends the younger one's school.

Cast
Heinz Rühmann as Dr. Hans Pfeiffer/Erich Pfeiffer
Ellen Frank as Marion Eisenhut
Inge Conradi as Ilse Bundschuh
Annemarie Sörensen as Eva Knauer
Jakob Tiedtke as Rektor Knauer
Else Bötticher as Frau Knauer
Oskar Sima as Professor Crey
Franz Weber as Bömmel, Oberlehrer
Karl Platen as Oertel, Pedell 
Rudolf Platte as Rettig, Tanzlehrer
Henriette Steinmann as Frau Windscheidt
Maria Seidler as Frau Bundschuh
Erwin van Roy as Bürglein, Regisseur
Walter Steinweg as Springer, Schauspieler
Anita Mey as Verehrerin
Evelyn Roberti as Soubrette

References

Bibliography 
 Goble, Alan. The Complete Index to Literary Sources in Film. Walter de Gruyter, 1999.
 Niven, Bill, Hitler and Film: The Führer's Hidden Passion. Yale University Press, 2018.

External links

1934 films
1934 comedy films
1930s German-language films
Films based on works by Heinrich Spoerl
Films of Nazi Germany
German black-and-white films
Films set in schools
1930s German films
Films directed by Robert A. Stemmle
Films shot at Halensee Studios